The 1968–69 C.D. Motagua season was F.C. Motagua's 4th season in the Honduran Liga Nacional and the 18th overall. Motagua was able to achieve both domestic League and Cup, thus becoming the first Honduran club to win a double.

League

After three season of poor performance, the club strengthened its squad with well talented Brazilian players, one of them being Roberto Abrussezze who finished top goal-scorer at the end of the season. On 9 March 1969, Motagua secured its first ever professional national championship in the 1–1 draw against all-time archrivals C.D. Olimpia; that result made them unreachable in the standings.

Squad
 All data is updated prior the beginning of the season.

Transfer in

Transfer out

Standings

Matches

Friendlies

Regular season
 Some matches missing, will include when available.

Cup

The 1968 Honduran Cup was the first knock-out tournament played in Honduran football, Motagua were seeded in Group A along Atlético Indio, C.D. Atlético Español, C.D. Olimpia and C.D. Victoria from which they advanced to the semifinals; once there, they faced Atlético Indio who defeated 1–0. On 22 December 1968, Motagua captured its first official cup by overcoming C.D. España on penalty shoot-outs in the final match at Estadio General Francisco Morazán in San Pedro Sula.

Matches

Group A

Semifinal

Final

References

External links
Motagua Official Website

F.C. Motagua seasons
Motagua
Motagua